Frederick Douglass - Greater Rochester International Airport  is a public airport located within the City of Rochester,  southwest of Downtown, in Monroe County, New York, United States. It is owned and operated by Monroe County. It is the fifth-busiest airport in the state of New York and the third-busiest outside of the New York City metropolitan area. The airport is home to the 642nd Aviation Support Battalion, part of the 42nd Infantry Division.

History

Early history

Baker Field
A 1910 newspaper article cited "a site near Scottsville Road", along with the Baker Farm in Genesee Valley Park, as possible locations for "airships" to fly from Rochester to Toronto. The Baker Farm was located south of the original Genesee Valley Park, and was donated to the Parks Department of the City of Rochester in 1908. The golf course at Genesee Valley Park was extended to include the Baker Farm in 1914. During World War I, the Baker Farm area of the park, renamed "Baker Field", was used for military purposes. The United States School of Aerial Photography had been created at Kodak Park in Rochester, and Baker Field was the airfield associated with the project. Military use of the field ceased in 1918. Baker Field continued to be used as an airfield for a year or two thereafter, but flood conditions made it unsuitable for airfield use in the long run. Britton Field, located just west of Baker Field, became the primary airport for the Rochester area.

Britton Field
The site of the Greater Rochester International Airport, originally known as Britton Field, was used for aviation purposes as early as 1919. The Rochester Aircraft Corporation launched its first passenger flight from Britton Field August 18, 1919. The Curtiss JN-4 was piloted by Earl F. Beers. At the time, the only way to get to the field was either by car or by taking the Genesee Street trolley line to the end, and walking the remaining distance. Beers, a Rochester aviation pioneer, urged the local government to purchase Britton Field for a municipal airport. In 1919, Beers offered passenger flights out of Britton Field, charging $1.00 per minute.

Britton Field hosted the United States Flying Circus, consisting of six planes, in September 1919. Dozens of planes landed in Britton Field as part of an aviation race across the United States and back again. The race was won by Lt. B. W. Maynard, "The Flying Parson", who arrived in Rochester, from Buffalo, at 10:30 AM October 18, 1919. His flight from Buffalo's Curtiss Field to Britton Field, a distance of 70 miles, in 22 minutes. He continued to Binghamton before finishing the race at Mineola at 1:50 PM that afternoon. Brittan Field was the scene of more competition when a pair of Rochester fliers and two from Syracuse raced between the two cities later in 1919, in a contest sponsored by the Rochester Aero Club and the Syracuse Aero Club. The Rochester newspaper reported that the two Rochester planes beat the combined flying time of the Syracuse pair by 15 seconds.

Purchase of the field as a "municipal aviation station" was authorized by the Rochester City Council in December 1919 The Rochester Aircraft Corporation proposed passenger service out of Britton Field across Lake Ontario to Toronto in 1920. "Young" Sparks, of Bradford, PA., demonstrated the early art of parachuting, by leaping from a plane from 2,100 feet, in an aerial field day at Britton Field in 1921. The United States Army considered Britton Field as a possible site for an airship mooring mast in 1924.

In the 1920s Eastman Kodak Company and the United States Army used Britton Field as landing field for the testing of Kodak's aerial photography experiments. The Fokker monoplane "Josephine Ford", flown by Commander Richard Byrd over the North Pole, was exhibited at Britton Field in October 1926, part of a nationwide tour intended to stimulate interest in aviation. During the Rochester exhibition, an unlicensed pilot, Charles Teleska, crashed his own plane.

The Colonial Air Transport Company, forerunner to American Airlines, developed plans in 1926 to run daytime flights from Boston to Chicago, stopping at Albany, Syracuse, Rochester, Buffalo, and Cleveland. An intersecting route from New York City to Montreal would cross at Albany, allowing for passenger transfers. The new route would carry passengers, mail and merchandise. Night flights were planned as soon as lighted fields were available. The Rochester Flying Club was formed that Fall, intending to keep Britton Field open to all aviation, and to start construction of a hangar and other improvements.

Charles Lindbergh flew The Spirit of St. Louis into Britton Field July 29, 1927, as part of an air tour of New York State. He was greeted by 75,000, according to newspaper reports. He stayed an hour and proceeded on to Buffalo. In the summer of 1927, the Rochester Community Players used Britton Field as one of the backdrops of their silent movie, "Fly Low Jack and The Game". The movie was written, directed, acted and produced by amateurs of the theater company, showcasing the new Cine-Kodak 16mm home movie system.

The first woman in Western New York to receive a pilot's license, Geraldine Grey of Buffalo, trained at Britton Field under the direction of William Dunlap in 1928.

Rochester Municipal Airport
The modern era of the Greater Rochester International Airport began in 1927, with the construction of Hangar No. 1 on a patch of land south of Rochester on Scottsville Road. The first scheduled passenger flights between New York City and Rochester were made that year. In 1928, the name was changed to Rochester Municipal Airport and more construction was completed, including improvements to the runways and drainage system, and Hangar No. 2. After the Second World War the airport saw a period of expansion as passenger volume, frequency of flights, and civilian pilot training increased. A flight training school, with nearly 1,000 students, was created.

On January 1, 1948, Monroe County took possession and control of the airport.

1953–1992 terminal
A new red-brick, single-level passenger terminal was opened on Brooks Avenue in 1953. It was expanded substantially in 1963, and expanded again in 1978 and 1980. The building had only one floor, until a small second floor was added for administrative offices as part of the 1980 expansion. At this time the airport was "Rochester Monroe County Airport."

After the 1963 expansion gave it its final layout, the terminal had ten gates in two concourses. A small three-gate concourse at the east end served American Airlines, and a longer, angled concourse at the west end served Mohawk Airlines (four gates on the east side) and United Airlines (three gates on the west side).

Jet service began ROC in 1965 on American Airlines Boeing 727s, but the two longest runways, 10–28 and 1–19 were short for jets.

In the late 1960s and early 1970s there was talk of building a Rochester-Buffalo airport in southeastern Niagara County, which would have taken over passenger traffic from Rochester-Monroe County and Greater Buffalo International Airport airports. This was never built.

The first jetways were added to gates 1 and 3 by American in 1977. As part of the 1978 expansion, new lounge space was built for Allegheny Airlines (successor to Mohawk) with three jetways. In about 1986 the airline (by then renamed USAir) added a fourth jetway. The 1980 expansion included two new lounge areas for United, each of which had one jetway. In 1987, Piedmont Airlines, which had taken over the United lounge closest to the terminal, added a second jetway to it. In about 1985, USAir built an expansion to the end of the main concourse to house a USAir Club.

The large new low-fare carrier People Express Airlines arrived at the airport in 1985. There was not room for them inside the terminal. A small ticket counter was built in office space in the northwest corner of the terminal, and a wooden peaked-roof shed was built on to house their outbound-baggage area, departure lounge, and baggage claim. No jetway was added. People's effect on fares was dramatic; ROC's enplanements increased 38% in 1985. When Continental Airlines took over People in 1987, they moved operations into the main terminal and shared gate space with American. The shed was removed.

In the mid-1980s, Monroe County Legislator Van Buren N. Hansford, Sr. (R-Pittsford) introduced successful legislation to have the airport's name changed to "Greater Rochester International Airport." By the end of the 1980s, The New York Air National Guard constructed a small hangar and office facility, and apron space, on the south side of the airport near the control tower. This facility has since been expanded.

Present terminal building

1988-1992 expansion project: new terminal 

The terminal was outgrown by the mid-1980s, and debate began about expanding the airport. In 1985, the administration of Monroe County Executive Lucien A. Morin (R) proposed a complicated terminal expansion that would have had baggage claim carousels across the driveway in a separate building, which tugs would have reached by a tunnel, and passengers would have reached by second-floor bridge corridors.

The County got as far as building temporary parking lots to the west and closing the main parking lots to begin construction on a garage. However, in 1988 the new County Executive, Thomas R. Frey (D) and the County Legislature had doubts about the cost of the project, and it was abandoned before construction started in earnest.

In 1988 Monroe County approved a $109 million plan to replace the terminal with an entirely new two-level facility with a second-level approach road and parking garage. The new facilities were built in stages on the exact site, between 1989 and 1992 and designed by HNTB and built by Wilmorite, Inc. Ticketing and departures are on the second floor, and baggage claim and ground transportation is on the first floor. The County Legislature authorized the creation of a "Monroe County Airport Authority" to issue the bonds for the construction.

This terminal has two angled concourses, each with 11 gates. Gate assignments are listed below. The eastern or B concourse opened in summer 1990. The eastern half of the main terminal opened in 1991. The western half of the main terminal, western or A concourse, and garage, all opened in 1992. A series of temporary prefabricated buildings were used to provide gate space and baggage claim space during the construction.

2006-2008 terminal improvements 
In 2006, Monroe County consolidated the separate security checkpoints at each concourse, to one central security checkpoint. Monroe County argued that this arrangement, although it would close the terminal's large concessions atrium and airfield views to non-passengers, would be more efficient and save money. The county replaced the lost public airfield view with a new viewing area at the west end of the terminal.

In 2008, renovations were undertaken to replace floors, carpets, and seating in the concourses, move explosives-scanning equipment from the ticketing lobby to the outbound baggage room, and replace 'T' shaped baggage claim carousels with four 360-degree walk-around carousels, which receive luggage from belts through the ceiling. These projects were completed by late 2009.

In January 2009, the airport began work on an extension of the three-story parking garage to the west, for additional capacity. By early 2010, that project was completed.

2016-2018 terminal renovations 

The concrete road decking of the departures level roadway was closed and repaired from April to July 2016. The Airport won the Governor Cuomo's Upstate Airport Economic and Revitalization Competition (UAERC) in 2016 and received nearly $40 million, for use to adapt and enhance the airport's facilities. A $54 million project was subsequently announced to create a high-tech smart facility that best serves the business and economic needs, while reducing barriers for passengers with disabilities, which broke ground in the spring of 2017. The UAERC sums were used to pay for a substantial portion of the project, with bonds and airport fees paying for remaining costs. By the fall, the total cost had ballooned to $79 million.

The security checkpoint was enlarged, now including two dedicated TSA pre-check lanes in addition to four general lanes. A consolidated exit passageway, leading from the secure Food Court to non-secure Baggage Claim, eliminated two previous exits at either end of the concourse. The Food Court was renovated and revamped with new restaurants and additional seating. Bathrooms, interior lighting in addition to accessibility services and way-finding were overhauled throughout the terminal.

A new cell-phone lot was built with flight-display information and an electric vehicle charging station, and is located off the airport roadway, now before the terminal building instead of after. A canopy added over the departures-level roadway reduces winter maintenance costs, and features solar panels, colorful aesthetic lighting, and rainwater storage capabilities. The project was completed in October 2018.

Airport events at-large 
Southwest Airlines replaced AirTran's service at the airport after its acquisition by the airline in 2013.

In 2014, New York State Police established a base for its aviation unit at the Monroe County Regional Traffic Operations Center on airport property, already a station for that agency. At least two helicopters, previously based out of Batavia and Syracuse, were moved to consolidate operations and reduce costs. This unit services Western and Central New York, including Buffalo, Rochester and Syracuse.

Allegiant Air started limited service out of Rochester, with flights to Orlando-Sanford that same year.

The Clock of Nations, previously at Midtown Plaza prior to 2007, was restored and moved to the airport Food Court in 2009. Planned to stay temporarily — until the clock's intended permanent home at the new Golisano Children's Hospital building was completed in 2014 — the hospital early in the design process opted to decline housing it, allotting the airport as an indefinite residence. It remained on display until 2017, before being disassembled and placed into storage before renovations started. The Clock of Nations will not be placed back in the terminal, as it can no longer occupy its previous location because of changes to the terminal layout. As of 2020, Monroe County has no plans for the clock's future home, which currently remains in storage.

In October 2018, Air Canada ended its service to Rochester from Toronto, leaving the airport without any international flights.

In May 2021, Frontier Airlines started new service to Orlando from Rochester.

Renaming efforts 

An online petition was started in July 2020 to rename the airport after Frederick Douglass, possibly to "Frederick Douglass International Airport". Soon after, County Executive Adam Bello said that Monroe County will begin to work with stakeholders - the FAA, Monroe County Legislature, among others - to examine and study a potential name change. Douglass lived in Rochester for much of his adult life and is buried at Mt. Hope Cemetery.

On August 12, 2020, Monroe County legislators confirmed that the airport would be renamed in honor of Douglass.

Airfield
It has three runways - a primary runway, a general aviation runway, and a crosswinds runway:

 4/22: , asphalt
 7/25: , asphalt
 10/28: , asphalt

Runways 4, 22 and 28 have Instrument Landing System (ILS); runway 4 has a Category II ILS.

In 2008 the airport completed two service roads around the end of Runway 28, near Interstate 390, in tunnels. The ground was graded upwards beyond the end of the runway to cover the tunnels. Earlier in the decade, a  overrun area was added to the east (10) end of this runway, adjacent to railroad tracks and housing. The EMAS consists of soft rubberized concrete into which an overrunning aircraft's wheels can sink, and the aircraft may be stopped safely before it veers onto the grass.

Movements
In 2017 the airport had 87,261 aircraft operations, average 239 per day: 44% general aviation, 26% air carrier, 26% air taxi and 3% military. 86 aircraft are based at the airport: 48 single engine, 10 multi-engine, 17 jet and 11 military.

Terminal
The Greater Rochester International Airport consists of a main terminal building with two angled concourses with 22 total passenger gates. The departures level has includes a ticketing hall, a six lane security checkpoint, post-security food court and two passenger concourses. The arrivals level has four baggage claim carousels, airline baggage offices, visitor information and car rental offices. A three-level parking garage, designated for long-term parking and rental cars, sits across the roadway from the terminal building. Fairfield Inn & Suites has an on-site hotel across the street from the terminal, just east of the parking garage.

JetBlue, Spirit, American and Southwest occupy Concourse A (also called Frederick Douglass Concourse) with gates A1-A11. United, Delta and Allegiant are in Concourse B (also known as Susan B. Anthony Concourse) with gates B1, B2, B2A, and B3-B10.

Airlines and destinations

Passenger

Cargo

Airlines and terminal

Greater Rochester International Airport has a two concourse terminal in the north of the airfield. The terminal is owned and operated by The Monroe County Airport Authority (MCAA). This terminal has two concourses, each with two stories. The top level of the terminal is home to shops, restaurants, bathrooms, and all gates. The bottom level is home to offices, ground service equipment, and US Customs and Immigration. The terminal has a total of twenty-one gates with ten gates in concourse A and eleven gates in concourse B. Both concourses have been named after somebody famous from Rochester. Concourse A is named after Frederick Douglass and concourse B is named after Susan B. Anthony. The airport handles eight regularly scheduled airlines and one charter airline

Concourse A handles:
American Airlines operates the Airbus A321, A320 and A319, Embraer E175, Mitsubishi CRJ900, Mitsubishi CRJ700, and Embraer ERJ145 aircraft
Frontier Airlines operates the Airbus A320neo, Airbus A320, and Airbus A321 aircraft
JetBlue Airways operates the Embraer E190 and the occasional Airbus A320
Southwest Airlines operates the Boeing 737MAX8, 737-800 and 737-700 aircraft
Spirit Airlines operates the Airbus A320neo

Concourse B handles:
Allegiant Air operates the Airbus A320 and Airbus A319 aircraft
Delta Airlines operates the Airbus A320, Airbus A319, Airbus A220, Embraer E175, Mitsubishi CRJ900, and Mitsubishi CRJ700 aircraft 
Swiftair operates the Boeing 737-400 aircraft
United Airlines operates the Boeing 737-900ER, 737-800, 737-700, Airbus A320, Airbus A319, Embraer E175, Embraer E170, Mitsubishi CRJ700, Mitsubishi CRJ550, Mitsubishi CRJ200, and Embraer ERJ145XR aircraft

Cargo

Greater Rochester International Airport has a cargo terminal in the northwest corner of the airfield. The terminal is operated by USAirports. This terminal has three cargo buildings, two hangars, and USAirports' three-story headquarters administrative building. The company was founded in Rochester in the 1980s as Airport Systems and later changed its name to USAirports. The company operates cargo terminals at several airports in the United States.

This cargo terminal handles:

Kalitta Charters operates Boeing 737-300F and the Boeing 737-400F for DHL
Other non-FedEx cargo carriers

FedEx operates its own cargo terminal on the southeastern border of the airport off Scottsville Road. It handles:

FedEx Express operates Boeing 767-300, Airbus A300-600, and the Friday Boeing 757-200.
FedEx Feeder operated by Wiggins Airways (flies Cessna 208 Caravans into ROC)

Statistics

Top destinations

Airline market share

Annual traffic

General aviation
Greater Rochester International Airport has two fixed-base operators supporting general aviation operations. USAirports and Avflight provide hangar, fuel, and maintenance support for general aviation aircraft. Both FBOs fuel and de-ice airline traffic.

Incidents
Mohawk Airlines Flight 121 crashed on takeoff July 2, 1963; seven died and 36 were injured.
Allegheny Airlines Flight 453 crash-landed on July 9, 1978, while arriving from Boston Logan International Airport. The BAC-111 aircraft was carrying 77 people. According to the NTSB report, the flight landed on Runway 28 at too high a speed, but with capability to reject the landing. The pilots chose to continue the landing, the aircraft skidded off the end of the runway, and its landing gear was sheared off by a ditch. There were no fatalities. The aircraft was written off.
On December 22, 1984, a Cessna 402B operated by Falcon Air, N8064Q, was destroyed while returning to land after a cargo door had opened during takeoff. The pilot was killed, no passengers were aboard. The NTSB listed the cause of the accident as pilot error including inadequate pre-flight planning, failure to maintain airspeed, pilot attentiveness, and inability to recognize and avoid stall. Contributing factors included high wind shear conditions and the baggage door opening upon takeoff.
On November 14, 2002, a Cessna 210L, N2444S, was destroyed during a forced landing and collision with terrain while on approach to land. The accident site was 1 mile east of the airport . The pilot was killed, no passengers were aboard. The NTSB determined the accident to be 'A loss of engine power for undetermined reasons.'
On February 22, 2012, a United Express Embraer ERJ-145 operated by Trans States Airlines from Chicago O'Hare skidded off the runway around 11:30 PM ET. Of the 45 people reported on board the flight, no one was injured.
On September 5, 2014, Socata TBM-700, with the registration N900KN, departed Rochester bound for Naples, Florida, and lost contact with Air Traffic Control. It is believed the pilot suffered from hypoxia. The aircraft crashed north of Jamaica, carrying Larry and Jane Glazer of Rochester, NY. They did not survive.
 On February 16, 2020, a Cessna 172M, with the registration N1126U, operated by Rochester Air Center LLC crashed upon landing at runway 25. No one was injured, but the aircraft suffered substantial damage.
 On June 5, 2020, a Kalitta Charters 737-400 affiliated with DHL, with registration N733CK, went off Runway 4/22 near the intersection of Runway 10/28. The plane bound for Hartford rejected a takeoff attempt after experiencing a mechanical issue, before veering off the runway and into the grass. The two pilots were not injured. The plane experienced minimal damage and was towed away.
 On August 1, 2021, United Express Flight 4583 performed an emergency landing on Runway 4/22 after a fuel leak and the resulting fuel imbalance. There were no fatalities.

References
 Airport Operations Data: AirportIQ 5010: AirportIQ 5010 FAA Source: Wayback Machine

External links

 
 
 

 Rochester Wiki Airport page
 Monroe County Airport Professional Firefighters – IAFF Local 1636
 KROC Airport Spotter's YouTube page

Transportation in Rochester, New York
Airports in New York (state)
Airports established in 1927
Transportation buildings and structures in Monroe County, New York